Lokeshwar Singh Panta is the Lokayukta of the state of Himachal Pradesh, was a judge of the Supreme Court of India and was the first chairperson of the National Green Tribunal.

Early life and education
He was born on 23 April 1944 in Tehsil Jubbal, District Shimla. After his primary education and graduation he obtained degree in Law from Faculty of Law, University of Delhi in the year 1970.

Career
On 22 July 1970 he enrolled as an Advocate and started practicing in Service Matters, Constitutional, Administrative Law, Civil & Labour Law, Criminal Law and Taxation in the High Court of Himachal Pradesh. During his advocacy career he served as the Secretary of the High Court Bar Association in the year 1976-77, Vice-President of the High Court Bar Association in the year 1986-87 and 15.07.1988 to 16.12.1988 and President of the High Court Bar Association from 17.12.1988 to 21.07.1989.

He was appointed as Deputy Advocate General of Himachal Pradesh on 28 February 1980.  Represented State of Himachal Pradesh before the Central Administrative Tribunal and Himachal Pradesh State Administrative Tribunal.  During this period, he was also assigned duties and functions of the Advocate General from December 1988 to March 1989. Also represented Himachal Pradesh Vidhan Sabha before Lokayukta. Later on served as Vigilance Officer in the Department of Advocate General of Himachal Pradesh.  He is a life member of the Executive Committee of the Indian Law Institute; Member of the Executive Council for the All India Law Institute (State Unit).

He was appointed Additional Judge of the High Court of Himachal Pradesh on 20 August 1991 and became permanent Judge from 28 July 1995. As a judge he was headed the Himachal Pradesh State Legal Services Authority since 26 December 1995 as its Executive Chairman and in February 2006,he was elevated to the Supreme Court of India, a rare honour for anyone from the Hill State. Served as a judge in Supreme Court of India till 23 April 2009. After retirement the Central Government on the recommendation of the Chief Justice of India, appointed him as the first Chairperson of the newly founded National Green Tribunal, on 18 October 2010 for a term of five years, an important Judicial Body in the Country and third in the World after Australia and New Zealand aimed at expanding, effective and expeditious disposal of cases relating to environmental protection and conservation of forests, he served the Tribunal till 31 December 2011 and currently serving as Lokayukta, Himachal Pradesh  from 3 February 2012.

References

Justices of the Supreme Court of India
Living people
Ombudsmen in India
Judges of the Himachal Pradesh High Court
People from Shimla district
1944 births
20th-century Indian judges
21st-century Indian judges